Esquires also known as  Esquires Coffee, or Esquires Coffee Houses is an international coffeehouse chain comprising more than 130-plus stores in Canada, the United Kingdom, Ireland, Portugal, the Middle East, China and Australasia.

Founded by Doug Williamson and Gary Buckland in Canada in 1993, the intellectual property and trademark rights for the business are now owned by New Zealand-based Cooks Global Foods Limited globally and by Retail Food Group in Australia.

History
The first Esquires Coffee House opened in the suburb of Sunshine Hills, a residential district of the city of Vancouver, British Columbia, Canada, in 1993. The business was started by Doug Williamson and Gary Buckland, 24 year old entrepreneurs and local business graduates. Doug Williamson was an accomplished television and film actor at the time, appearing in several films and starring in numerous television shows, and he credits the early success of Esquires to running the coffee house like a theatre production, casting the cafe with an ensemble whose primary purpose was to deliver a special experience to Esquires' guests. As he puts it, “We had a really cool culture because we didn’t know any better; we didn’t behave like we were running a business.  We were giving a performance and hoping people enjoyed themselves. Coffee was the conduit, mostly."

In 1994 Doug and Gary on-boarded Peter E. Wudy, one of Canada's leading franchise consultants, to assist with expansion.  With Peter's help and guidance, the chain expanded rapidly and 37 branches were opened across Canada, primarily on the west coast of British Columbia, before the company went international on a franchise basis.

Esquires expanded to the United Kingdom in 2000, followed by Ireland in 2001.  Peter Kirton purchased the master license rights for Esquires Coffee U.K. Limited, which he held until purchased by Cooks Global Foods in 2013.  Tony McVerry purchased the master license rights for Esquires Coffee Ireland, which he held until purchased by Cooks Global Foods in 2013.

In 2002, brothers Stuart and Lewis Deeks established the Esquires brand in Australasia through a master franchise agreement with the Canadian parent. Under the name Franchise Development Ltd, they grew the business to become the leading branded chain in New Zealand by store numbers.

In 2011, the Deeks sold the Australia and New Zealand franchise rights to Retail Food Group while retaining the rights to the Middle East, China and a number of other jurisdictions.

In 2013, the Deeks merged their business into NZX-listed Cooks Global Foods. In April 2013, Cooks acquired the intellectual property and master franchising rights to Esquires Coffee Houses worldwide - excluding New Zealand and Australia. The company also owns wholesale businesses in related industries.  Cooks immediately hired Doug Williamson, one of the original founders, to re-join the organisation and run the United Kingdom business. Under Doug's leadership, Esquires Coffee U.K. rebranded their 23 store estate, re-modelled the business and re-introduced Esquires Coffee as a franchise investment opportunity.  As of 2019, Esquires have expanded from 23 stores to 53 stores, with regional development commitments which will see the chain expand to 125 U.K. stores by 2028.

Today there are more than 40 Esquires stores in Australia and New Zealand operated by Retail Food Group including two drive-thru outlets.

In April 2014, Cooks Global Foods acquired the Esquires Canadian intellectual property rights, the original Esquires franchisor founded in 1993.

Franchising
Cooks Global Foods owns the Esquires Coffee Houses brand and system in Canada, the United Kingdom and Ireland - where it also directly franchises stores - and the Middle East and China where stores are franchised through master franchise holders.

In October 2013, the parent company presented its plans to consolidate and grow the business, with a minimum objective of 580 Esquires stores globally by 2020.

In the United Kingdom and Ireland, Esquires owns the master franchises covering 38 stores and a refurbishment programme is underway to ensure that the branding is aligned with the global design and to upgrade stores and to ensure that service consistency is enhanced.

In the Middle East, the company has commitments for the development of more than 80 Esquires Coffee Houses in the world's most influential Arab economic alliance. Master Franchisees currently operate stores in all Gulf Co-operation Council (GCC) countries Saudi Arabia, Kuwait, Bahrain, and the UAE.  Oman and Qatar have recently signed master franchise agreements and will have stores operating during 2014.

In China, Esquires is currently looking for investors who may be experienced franchisees, experienced hospitality retailers, investors - wanting to open territories and commit to opening a specific number of stores.

In North America, Esquires now licenses back to Esquires Canada the right to use the IP to the existing 14 Esquires Coffee Houses stores in British Columbia and for a Master Franchise Agreement for Alberta. Esquires plans to focus on aggressive growth nationwide which will include the construction of a number of new corporate flagships this year and expansion into other Canadian provinces.

In 2018 Esquires Coffee Open its first store in Pakistan and Jordan.

See also
 List of coffeehouse chains

References

Coffeehouses and cafés in Canada
Food and drink companies based in Vancouver
Retail companies established in 1993
Restaurants established in 1993